This is a list of holidays in Cape Verde.

Public holidays

References 

 
Cape Verdean culture
Cape Verde
Law of Cape Verde